Tuomo Könönen (born 29 December 1977) is a Finnish football player currently playing for PS Kemi.

External links
  Profile at veikkausliiga.com

References

1977 births
Living people
People from Trollhättan
Finnish footballers
Finnish expatriate footballers
Finland international footballers
Könönen, Tuomo
Eliteserien players
Myllykosken Pallo −47 players
Könönen, Tuomo
Odds BK players
Expatriate footballers in Norway
Finnish expatriate sportspeople in Norway
Kemi City F.C. managers
Association football fullbacks
Finnish football managers